Boryana Rossa (born 1972) is a Bulgarian interdisciplinary artist and curator making performance art, video and photographic work.

Life and work
Her artwork has been exhibited at the National Gallery of Fine Arts in Sofia, Goethe Institute, the Moscow Biennial, the Elizabeth A. Sackler Center for Feminist Art at the Brooklyn Museum, Exit Art, Biennial for Electronic Art in Perth, and Foundation for Art and Creative Technologies in Liverpool.

Rossa frequently collaborates with artist and filmmaker Oleg Mavromati, often under the title Ultrafuturo—an art collective started in 2004.

She has been awarded the Gaudenz B. Ruf Award for New Bulgarian Art, the Essential Reading for Art Writers Award from the Institute of Contemporary Art in Sofia, and a New York Foundation for the Arts Fellowship in 2014 in Digital/Electronic Arts.

She is currently an Assistant Professor of Transmedia at Syracuse University.

Rossa identifies herself as a heterosexual woman with a queer identity.

She supports LGBT and queer rights.

References

1972 births
Living people
Women performance artists
Bulgarian emigrants to the United States
Feminist artists
Bulgarian artists
Interdisciplinary artists
Queer women
Queer artists
Bulgarian LGBT rights activists
21st-century LGBT people